Sword of Honour is an action-adventure video game developed by Dynafield Systems in 1992 for Amiga, Commodore 64 and PC DOS systems. The game took almost three years to finish.

Gameplay 
Sword of Honour combines the action-adventure oriented gameplay of the 1987 game The Last Ninja with the side-scrolling perspective of the 1986 games Ninja (aka Ninja Mission) and Fist II: The Legend Continues, and the icon-based controls of the 1987 game Barbarian. The player fights enemies (either in unarmed combat or with the aid of ninjatō, kusarigama, tekagi-shuko, shuriken and kunai), avoids traps, collects and uses items, and interacts with characters.

Plot 
The player takes a role of an elite ninja sent for a mission to recover the stolen family sword of the fictional Shogun Yuichiro from a castle of his enemy, the evil Lord Toranaga. The ninja must retrieve the sword and punish Toranaga before Yuichiro will be forced to commit seppuku.

Reception 
The game received mixed reviews and scores, from 86% in CU Amiga (calling it "an excellent combat title, but there is so much more in there that you would be a complete fool to miss it"), to 77% in The One and 67% in Amiga Format, to only 23% in Amiga Power (which said the game "sets a low standard, and still fails to reach it").

See also 
Sword of Honour (disambiguation)

External links 

Sword Of Honour Amiga - HOL database
Sword of Honour - Lemon Amiga

1992 video games
Action-adventure games
Amiga games
Commodore 64 games
DOS games
Japan in non-Japanese culture
Video games about ninja
Side-scrolling beat 'em ups
Video games developed in Germany
Video games set in feudal Japan